Guillaume Dequaire (born 11 July 1990) is a French professional footballer who plays as a centre-back for Belgian club URSL Visé.

Club career
On 31 August 2021, he joined URSL Visé in the Belgian third-tier Belgian National Division 1.

Career statistics
.

References

External links
 
 

1990 births
Living people
Sportspeople from Besançon
French footballers
French expatriate sportspeople in Belgium
Expatriate footballers in Belgium
Association football defenders
Racing Besançon players
K.V. Oostende players
ÉFC Fréjus Saint-Raphaël players
LB Châteauroux players
FC Chambly Oise players
URSL Visé players
Championnat National players
Challenger Pro League players
Footballers from Bourgogne-Franche-Comté